Maishe Maphonya (1951-2021) was a South Africa a political activist, playwright, director and poet. Maponya was born in Alexandra Township but his family was forcibly relocated to Diepkloof, Soweto in 1961.

Biography and career
Maponya was born in poverty under apartheid era in Alexandra Township, later his family was forcibly removed to Diepkloof, Soweto. His love for reading and writing was sparked at an early age, this is also when he became politically conscious and began to write poetry and stage productions that reflected the conditions of Black people in South Africa.

References

1951 births
2021 deaths
20th-century South African male actors
South African dramatists and playwrights
People from Alexandra, Gauteng